Oleksandr Komarov  Oleksandr Komarov (Ukrainian: Олександр Комаров; born 1972) is a Ukrainian telecommunications top-level manager, CEO of Kyivstar 
 Oleksandr Komarov (Ukrainian: Олександр Комаров; born 1988) is a Ukrainian Paralympic swimmer

See also 
 Aleksandr Komarov (wrestler)
 Aleksandr Komarov (ice hockey)
 Komarov (surname)